Anuja Chandra-Thakur (born 1983) is an Indian amateur player of snooker and English billiards.

She won the WLBSA Ladies World Billiards Championship title in April 2005, in a 243–136 victory over Lynette Horsburgh of Scotland, and reached the semi-final at the 2006 IBSF World Snooker Championship in Amman, Jordan, where she was eliminated by Jaique Ip 4–2.

Biography 
Thakur is a native of Mumbai, Maharashtra. She has won several state and national championships in both snooker and billiards. Her sister, Meenal Thakur, is also a player in both disciplines. Anuja is married to Manan Chandra, another Indian amateur billiards player.

Titles and achievements
Snooker

English billiards

References

Living people
1983 births
Indian snooker players
Sportspeople from Mumbai
Cue sports players at the 2006 Asian Games
Cue sports players at the 2010 Asian Games
Female snooker players
Female players of English billiards
Indian players of English billiards
Sportswomen from Maharashtra
Cue sports players from Maharashtra
Asian Games competitors for India
World champions in English billiards
Recipients of the Arjuna Award